Amanda L. Adkins (born 1974/1975) is an American politician and businesswoman who was the chairwoman of the Kansas Republican Party from 2009 to 2013. She was the Republican nominee for Kansas's 3rd congressional district in both the 2020 election and 2022 election, losing both times to Democratic incumbent Sharice Davids.

Education 
Adkins earned a Bachelor of Science degree in human biology and anthropology from the University of Kansas in 1998.

Career 
After graduating from the University of Kansas, Adkins was a legislative aide in the United States Senate for two years and a staffer on the United States House Committee on Rules. She later worked as the legislative director for Congressman David Dreier. She then worked as the director of GOPAC, a Republican political action committee and 527 training organization.

Adkins worked for the healthcare IT firm Cerner for 15 years. She took a leave of absence from her role as vice president for strategic growth in order to run for the U.S. House in 2020. In January 2021, she left the company permanently.

Elections

2020 U.S. House campaign 

In the 2020 election, Adkins was a candidate for Kansas's 3rd congressional district. She won the Republican primary election against four other candidates but was defeated by the incumbent Democrat, Sharice Davids, in the November general election.

2022 U.S. House campaign 

In April 2021, Adkins announced that she would again run as a Republican candidate for the district in the 2022 election. She won the Republican primary election against John McCaughrean and lost to incumbent Democrat Davids on a rematch in the November general election.

Personal life 
Adkins and her husband, Jason, have two children. They live in Overland Park, Kansas.

References

External links
 

1970s births
21st-century American politicians
21st-century American women politicians
Businesspeople from Kansas
Candidates in the 2020 United States elections
Candidates in the 2022 United States House of Representatives elections
Kansas Republicans
Living people
Politicians from Overland Park, Kansas
State political party chairs of Kansas
United States congressional aides
University of Kansas alumni
Women in Kansas politics
Year of birth uncertain